Daniel Sebastián Martínez Álvarez (born August 16, 1981 in Montevideo), known as Daniel Martínez, is a Uruguyan footballer currently playing for Unión Magdalena in the Categoría Primera B of Colombia.

Azerbaijan career statistics

Honours

Club
El Tanque Sisley
 2009-2010 Uruguayan Segunda División champion

Individual
 2009-2010 Uruguayan Segunda División goalscorer (10 goals)

Notes

References

External links
 
 Profile at Tenfield Digital 
 

1981 births
Living people
Uruguayan footballers
Uruguayan expatriate footballers
Peñarol players
Juventud de Las Piedras players
C.D. Huachipato footballers
Plaza Colonia players
El Tanque Sisley players
Unión Magdalena footballers
Uruguayan Segunda División players
Azerbaijan Premier League players
Chilean Primera División players
Expatriate footballers in Argentina
Expatriate footballers in Azerbaijan
Expatriate footballers in Chile
Expatriate footballers in Colombia
Expatriate footballers in Honduras
Uruguayan expatriate sportspeople in Argentina
Uruguayan expatriate sportspeople in Azerbaijan
Uruguayan expatriate sportspeople in Chile
Uruguayan expatriate sportspeople in Colombia
Uruguayan expatriate sportspeople in Honduras
Association football forwards